A referendum on the withdrawal of Soviet troops was held in Lithuania on 14 June 1992. Voters were asked whether Soviet troops (which by the time of the referendum had become Russian troops) should unconditionally and immediately withdraw from the country. It was approved by 92.6% of those voting and 69.0% of all registered voters, passing the 50% threshold.

Results

References

1992 referendums
1992 in Lithuania
Referendums in Lithuania
Dissolution of the Soviet Union